The Tung Chung Terminal is a station of the gondola lift known as Ngong Ping 360, in Tung Chung, on the northwestern coast of Lantau Island, Hong Kong. It was opened on 18 September 2006.

References

External links
 

Transport in Hong Kong
Tung Chung